The 2018–19 season was Fenerbahçe's 61st consecutive season in the Süper Lig and their 111th year in existence.

Players

First-team squad

|-
|colspan=12 align=center|Players sold or loaned out after the start of the season

Transfers

In

Out

Total spending:  €16.04M

Total income:  $3M – €22.50M

Expenditure:  $3M    €6.46M

Pre-season and friendlies

Pre-season

Mid-season

Competitions

Overview

Süper Lig

League table

Results summary

Pld = Matches played; W = Matches won; D = Matches drawn; L = Matches lost; GF = Goals for; GA = Goals against; GD = Goal difference; Pts = Points

Results by round

Matches

Turkish Cup

Fifth round

Round of 16

UEFA Champions League

Third qualifying round

UEFA Europa League

Group stage

Knockout phase

Round of 32

Statistics

References

Fenerbahçe S.K. (football) seasons
Fenerbahce
Fenerbahce